Andrew Veal is a former Australian rules footballer, who played for the Fitzroy Football Club in the Victorian Football League (VFL).

Career
Veal played six games for Fitzroy in the 1980 season, without scoring.

References

External links

1964 births
Living people
Fitzroy Football Club players
Australian rules footballers from Victoria (Australia)